Sweden entered the Eurovision Song Contest, held in Dublin, Ireland. Sveriges Television continued to use the Melodifestivalen contest to select the Swedish entry.

Before Eurovision

Melodifestivalen 1994 
Melodifestivalen 1994 was the selection for the 34th song to represent Sweden at the Eurovision Song Contest. It was the 33rd time that this system of picking a song had been used. 1,560 songs were submitted to SVT for the competition. The final was held in the SVT Studios in Stockholm on 12 March 1994, presented by Kattis Ahlström and Sven Melander and was broadcast on TV1 and Sveriges Radio's P3 and P4 networks. The show was watched by 3,780,000 people.

At Eurovision 
Bergman and Pontare opened the contest, singing 1st of 25 countries, preceding Finland. At the close of the voting they had received 48 points, placing 13th.

Voting

References

External links
TV broadcastings at SVT's open archive

1994
Countries in the Eurovision Song Contest 1994
1994
Eurovision
Eurovision